Browning Mummery may refer to:
Browning Mummery (1888–1974), Australian tenor and actor of the 1920s and 1930s
Browning Mummery (Electronic sound works), a name adopted in 1983 by Australian electronic musician Andrew Lonsdale